Hans Mollet (1901 – 21 February 1957) was a Swiss wrestler. He competed in the men's freestyle lightweight at the 1928 Summer Olympics.

References

External links
 

1901 births
1957 deaths
Swiss male sport wrestlers
Olympic wrestlers of Switzerland
Wrestlers at the 1928 Summer Olympics
Place of birth missing